"Jungle Drum" is the third single released from Icelandic singer-songwriter Emilíana Torrini's third album, Me and Armini. It was released as a digital download on 9 March 2009 and later on 19 June 2009 as a CD single in Germany.

Critical reception
Critics received the song very warmly; Popmatters' reviewer Spencer Tricker called "Jungle Drum" the "catchiest tune" on the album (alongside "Big Jumps"), "every bit as good as the singles from Fisherman's Woman". He also praised the song for boasting "an irresistible chorus that features some totally unexpected scatting". Matthew Allard from ARTISTdirect stated the song "should be an iPhone ad". Clickmusic reviewer Francis Jolley called the song "a sprightly, fun little gem, reminiscent of Nancy Sinatra in her heyday" and "infectious Scandinavian pop". Both Popmatters and Clickmusic reviews praised the song's rhythm section calling it impossible "to not foot tap along" to.

Appearances in media
In 2009 it also appeared in the Germany's Next Topmodel TV show. Thus, the song became very popular in German-speaking countries. It was planned to appear in the dance video game Just Dance 3 but it did not appear for unknown reasons.

In 2010 the track was used as a theme song in a video made for the Government of Iceland's official campaign "Inspired by Iceland" to lure tourists to visit Iceland.

Track listings
Digital download
 "Jungle Drum" — 2:13

German CD single
 "Jungle Drum" — 2:13
 "Me and Armini" — 4:17

Chart performance
The song debuted on the German Singles Chart at number 12 and peaked at number one on its fourth week, where it stayed for eight consecutive weeks. It stayed on that chart for a total of 35 weeks. The song also reached number one in Austria and Flanders.

Weekly charts

Year-end charts

Decade-end charts

Certifications

Release history

Covers
 In 2009, the song had been covered by German band The Baseballs and is featured on their cover album Strike! Back!.
 In 2009, Austrian hip hop artist Chakuza sampled the song on his free track "Jungle Drum Mix".
 In 2019, German metal band Emil Bulls released the song on their cover album called "Mixtape".

References

Emilíana Torrini songs
2008 songs
2009 singles
Number-one singles in Austria
Number-one singles in Germany
Songs about drums
Songs written by Dan Carey (record producer)
Songs written by Emilíana Torrini
Ultratop 50 Singles (Flanders) number-one singles